Cheshmeh Ala may refer to:

Cheshmeh A‘la
Cheshmeh Ali, Qom